Mark Lane may refer to:
Mark Lane (author) (1927–2016), attorney, researcher, and author who wrote Rush to Judgment
Mark Lane (cricketer, born 1968), English cricketer
Mark Lane (journalist), American journalist and author
Mark Lane (New Zealand cricketer) (born 1969), New Zealand cricketer
 Mark Lane (broadcaster) Garden designer
Mark Lane, London, a street in London
Mark Lane tube station, a former station on the London Underground

Lane, Mark